Silvanus muticus is a species of silvanid flat bark beetle in the family Silvanidae. It is found in Central America and North America.

References

Further reading

 
 
 

Silvanidae
Beetles described in 1899